Victor Lawrence (9 June 1898 – 28 June 1940) was an Australian rugby league player who played in the 1920s.  Lawrence was the brother of Jack Lawrence who also played for Souths.

Background
Lawrence was born at Waterloo, New South Wales in 1898.

Playing career
Lawrence played his junior football for Waterloo, and was graded with South Sydney in 1920. Lawrence played nine seasons with Souths between 1920–1928 and played in two winning Grand Finals in 1926 and 1927.  He also played 11 games in the 1925 season as the club went undefeated to claim the premiership.  He mostly played centre in teams that featured the greats of the era such as Alf Blair, Benny Wearing, George Treweek and Eddie Root.

He represented New South Wales on three occasions in 1927.  He played a total of 125 games for South Sydney across all grades.

Death
Lawrence died on 28 June 1940 aged 42.

References

South Sydney Rabbitohs players
New South Wales rugby league team players
Australian rugby league players
1898 births
1940 deaths
Rugby league centres
Rugby league wingers
Rugby league players from Sydney

South Sydney Rabbitohs captains